Judaic Publishing Co. was an antisemitic publishing entity controlled by Henry Hamilton Beamish, an Irish-born antisemite. In 1920 Beamish took over the publication of The Jewish Peril from Eyre & Spottiswoode, and published it under the imprint of The Britons. Subsequently, this entity was effectively merged by Beamish and his associates into the Britons Publishing Company , which continued disseminating antisemitic propaganda . The British Library has three imprints by this entity which are listed below.

Works 
The Jews’ Who’s Who. Israelite finance: its sinister influence
Judaic Publishing Co.: London, 1920
pp. 255

The Jews’ who’s who. Israelite finance: its sinister influence ... Popular edition
by Henry Hamilton Beamish
London: Judaic Publishing Co., 1921
pp. 255. 18 cm.

Letters from Palestine, February–April, 1922
Bessie Pullen Burry
Judaic Publishing Co.: London, [1922]
pp. 137.

References 
 Sharman Kadish, Bolsheviks and British Jews, The Anglo-Jewish Community, Britain and the Russian Revolution, London, 1992 .
 Richard C. Thurlow, Fascism in Britain: From Oswald Mosley's Blackshirts to the National Front 

Book publishing companies of the United Kingdom
British fascist movements
Political book publishing companies
Political advocacy groups in the United Kingdom
Publishing companies established in 1920